The War Eagle Bridge is a historic bridge in War Eagle, Arkansas, United States, that is listed on the National Register of Historic Places.

Description
The one-lane steel truss bridge is located on War Eagle Road (County Road 98), passing over the War Eagle Creek. It was built in 1907 and adjoins the War Eagle Mill.
 
The construction plans and drawings, contract, and correspondence are available at the Benton County Courthouse.

History
The bridge occupies the site of a ford that has been used since the 1830s. Sylvanus Blackburn built a two-story log house near the west side and a mill on the east side of the ford in 1832. By the early twentieth century the mill was producing 40 barrels of flour per day, creating a need for better access to local markets.

The bridge was constructed in 1907 by the Illinois Steel Bridge Company of Jacksonville, Illinois, for a contracted amount of $4,790. It is the only Parker truss bridge in northwest Arkansas, and one of only seventeen steel truss bridges in the state. The stone range work pier and abutment on the eastern end and wooden planking for the bridge flooring were provided locally. The stone pier and abutment were replaced with a concrete structure in 1982.

The bridge was listed on the National Register of Historic Places on November 19, 1985.

See also
List of bridges documented by the Historic American Engineering Record in Arkansas
List of bridges on the National Register of Historic Places in Arkansas
National Register of Historic Places listings in Benton County, Arkansas

References

Further reading

External links

Road bridges on the National Register of Historic Places in Arkansas
Bridges completed in 1907
Transportation in Benton County, Arkansas
Historic American Engineering Record in Arkansas
National Register of Historic Places in Benton County, Arkansas
Steel bridges in the United States
Parker truss bridges in the United States
1907 establishments in Arkansas